Tove Kathrine Mohr (née Møller) (3 March 1891 – 26 August 1981) was a Norwegian physician, socialist, and proponent for women's rights.

Biography
Tove Kathrine Møller was born at Thorsø in Østfold, Norway. 
She was the eldest of three children born to Katti Anker Møller and Kai Møller. Her father was a member of the Norwegian Parliament and her mother was a pioneer women's right advocate. She was raised on the family estate, Thorsø  Manor (Thorsø herregård) in Torsnes. She attended  Ragna Nielsens pikeskole in Kristiania (now Oslo). She began  studying medicine in 1910 and  graduated from the medical department at the Rikshospitalet in 1917.

In 1914, she was married to  professor  Otto Lous Mohr with whom she had three children, including Tove Pihl.

In 1922, she started private practice. From 1928-31,  she was a teacher in physiology and health care at the State School of Education at Stabekk. In addition to her professional work as physician,  Mohr was politically active. She had a number of public positions. She was member of a number of governmental commissions for preparing law revisions.

She also wrote a biography about her mother:  Katti Anker Møller: en banebryter.

References

Related reading
Mohr, Tove (1976) Katti Anker Møller: en banebryter (Tiden Norsk Forlag) 
Grande, Odd  (1961)  Kai Møller : Herren til Thorsø  (Oslo : Gyldendal)

1891 births
1981 deaths
People from Fredrikstad
Norwegian feminists
Norwegian obstetricians and gynaecologists
Norwegian women physicians
Anker family
Norwegian socialist feminists